Zamora the Torture King is the stage name of Tim Cridland, an American sideshow performer. Zamora was an original member of the Jim Rose Circus, where he performed painful feats as entertainment. His stunts include fire eating, sword swallowing, body skewering and electric shock. Zamora co-authored (with Jan Gregor) Circus of the Scars, a history of the Jim Rose Circus.

Zamora has been featured on Ripley's Believe It or Not!, 48 Hours, Man Vs Weird and Stan Lee's Superhumans.

References

External links
ABC News article about Zamora and Pain Management

Year of birth missing (living people)
Living people
Sideshow performers